Nathan Ferguson may refer to:

Nathan Ferguson (footballer, born 1995), English footballer who plays for Southend United
Nathan Ferguson (footballer, born 2000), English footballer who plays for Crystal Palace